Mueang Kai is a tambon (subdistrict) of Mae Taeng District, in Chiang Mai Province, Thailand. In 2020 it had a total population of 1,694 people.

History
The subdistrict was created effective August 27, 1976 by splitting off 4 administrative villages from Sop Poeng.

Administration

Central administration
The tambon is subdivided into 5 administrative villages (muban).

Local administration
The whole area of the subdistrict is covered by the subdistrict administrative organization (SAO) Mueang Kai (องค์การบริหารส่วนตำบลเมืองก๋าย).

References

External links
Thaitambon.com on Mueang Kai

Tambon of Chiang Mai province
Populated places in Chiang Mai province